Peter Inskip is an Australian former professional rugby league footballer who played for Canterbury-Bankstown and North Sydney in the NSWRL.

Career
A fullback, Inskip spent his early career in Tamworth and in 1968 represented NSW Country Firsts. He also went on a tour of New Zealand that year with a NSW Country squad.

Inskip transferred to Canterbury in 1970, slotting in at fullback due to an injury to Les Johns, who he also replaced as goal-kicker. He was a permanent fixture in the team in 1970 and featured in Canterbury's finals series. Johns returned from injury in 1971 which restricted Inskip's first-grade appearances and he ended the year with a reserves premiership.

In 1972 he crossed over to North Sydney, where he was the regular first-grade fullback. A left-footer, Inskip kicked a club record equalling 10 goals in North Sydney's round three win over Penrith and in round 10 booted the winning field goal in the last minute to defeated his former club Canterbury.

References

External links
Peter Inskip at Rugby League project

Living people
Australian rugby league players
Canterbury-Bankstown Bulldogs players
North Sydney Bears players
Country New South Wales rugby league team players
Rugby league fullbacks
Year of birth missing (living people)